John Davis House may refer to:

 John A. Davis House, Albany, Georgia, listed on the NRHP in Dougherty County, Georgia
 John Davis House (Chelsea, Maine), listed on the NRHP in Kennebec County, Maine
 John Davis House (Fayetteville, North Carolina), listed on the NRHP in Cumberland County, North Carolina
 John and Magdalena Davis Farm, Oregon City, Oregon, listed on the NRHP in Clackamas County, Oregon

See also
Davis House (disambiguation)